The Muzaffarabad Tigers is a Pakistani professional T20 franchise cricket team that competes in the Kashmir Premier League. It was founded in 2021 in the inaugural edition of Kashmir Premier League. The team is captained by Mohammad Hafeez and coached by Misbah-ul-Haq. The franchise represents Muzaffarabad which is capital and largest city of Azad Kashmir.

History

2021 season

In the group stage, they won 3 out of their 5 matches and came second in the group stages which meant that they reached the qualifier. They defeated Rawalakot Hawks in the qualifier and qualified for the final. They were defeated by Rawalakot Hawks in the final by 7 runs and finished the tournament as runner-ups.

2022 season 

In July 2022, Mohammad Hafeez was retained as Muzaffarabad Tigers’ icon player.

Team identity

Current squad

Captains

Coaches

Result summary

Overall result in KPL

Head-to-head record

Source: , Last updated: 31 January 2022

Statistics

Most runs 

Source: , Last updated: 22 August 2022

Most wickets 

Source: , Last Updated: 22 August 2022

References

External links

Cricket teams in Pakistan
Kashmir Premier League (Pakistan)